Alexandru Aldea may refer to:

 Alexander I Aldea (1397–1436), Prince of Wallachia
 Alexandru Aldea (footballer) (born 1995), Romanian footballer